The Diamond Jubilee of Queen Victoria was officially celebrated on 22 June 1897 to mark the occasion of the 60th anniversary of Queen Victoria's accession on 20 June 1837. Queen Victoria was the first British monarch ever to celebrate a Diamond Jubilee.

Background
Queen Victoria surpassed her grandfather King George III as the longest-reigning British monarch on 23 September 1896, an event that she marked privately at Balmoral Castle. She wrote in her journal, "People wished to make all sorts of demonstrations, which I asked them not to do until I had completed the sixty years next June." The Diamond Jubilee was therefore an opportunity to celebrate Victoria's status as longest-reigning monarch, in addition to marking 60 years on the throne. On 20 June 1897, the sixtieth anniversary of her accession, Victoria wrote in her journal:

The sixtieth anniversary of her accession was celebrated on 20 June 1897 with a thanksgiving service at St George's Chapel, Windsor Castle.

Celebrations

The occasion was marked publicly two days later by the Festival of the British Empire proposed by Joseph Chamberlain, who promoted the idea of a global celebration fit for a monarch ruling over 450 million people. The day was declared a bank holiday in Britain, Ireland and India. The British Army and Royal Navy as well as troops from Canada, India, Africa and the South Pacific took part in the procession in London. The Queen telegraphed a message to all nations in the British Empire: "From my heart I thank my beloved people. May God bless them."

At 11:15 am, the Queen, along with Princess Helena and the Princess of Wales, took part in the parade in an open carriage from Buckingham Palace to St Paul's Cathedral, where thanksgiving service took place. Seventeen other carriages carrying members of the royal family followed her. Eleven colonial prime ministers were in attendance:

 The Prime Minister of Canada and Lady Laurier
 The Premier of New South Wales
 The Premier of Victoria and Lady Turner
 The Premier of New Zealand and Mrs Seddon
 The Premier of Queensland and Lady Nelson
 The Premier of South Australia and Mrs Kingston
 The Prime Minister of Cape Colony and Lady Sprigg
 The Premier of Tasmania and Lady Braddon
 The Premier of Newfoundland and Lady Whiteway
 The Premier of Western Australia and Lady Forrest
 The Prime Minister of Natal and Mrs Escombe

Suffering from severe arthritis and unable to climb the steps, the Queen remained in her coach, so the short service of thanksgiving was held outside the building. She was joined by the clergy and dignitaries. Victoria returned to Buckingham Palace after touring a large area of London. Later, when reflecting on the occasion Victoria said: 

Thousands of residents in London and Manchester took part in street feasts, where Thomas Lipton distributed free ale and tobacco. A chain of beacons were lit across the United Kingdom and Nottingham, Bradford and Hull were granted their city charter as part of the celebrations. The following day the Queen visited Constitution Hill in the City of London where 10,000 schoolchildren had gathered, and attended a reception in Slough.

The celebrations lasted a fortnight and a garden party at Buckingham Palace and a state banquet were held to mark the occasion. Memorial fountains and towers were erected to mark the occasion, including the Jubilee Tower on the moors above Darwen in Lancashire and the Cunningham Clock Tower in Peshawar on the North West Frontier of British India. Alfred Austin and Rudyard Kipling also wrote special poems in honour of the Queen.

Royal guests at the Jubilee celebrations

British royal family
 The Queen of the United Kingdom
  The Empress Frederick, the Queen's daughter
  The Hereditary Princess of Saxe-Meiningen, the Queen's granddaughter (representing the Duke of Saxe-Meiningen)
  Princess Feodora of Saxe-Meiningen, the Queen's great-granddaughter
  Prince and Princess Henry of Prussia, the Queen's grandson and granddaughter (representing the German Emperor)
  Princess and Prince Adolf of Schaumburg-Lippe, the Queen's granddaughter and grandson-in-law (representing the Prince of Schaumburg-Lippe)
 Princess and Prince Frederick Charles of Hesse, the Queen's granddaughter and grandson-in-law
 The Prince and Princess of Wales, the Queen's son and daughter-in-law
 The Duke and Duchess of York, the Queen's grandson and granddaughter-in-law
 Prince Edward of York, the Queen's great-grandson
 Prince Albert of York, the Queen's great-grandson
 Princess Mary of York, the Queen's great-granddaughter
 Princess Louise, Duchess of Fife and The Duke of Fife, the Queen's granddaughter and grandson-in-law
 Princess Victoria of Wales, the Queen's granddaughter
  Princess and Prince Charles of Denmark, the Queen's granddaughter and grandson-in-law
 Grand Duchess Alice of Hesse and by Rhine's family:
 Princess and Prince Louis of Battenberg, the Queen's granddaughter and grandson-in-law
 Princess Alice of Battenberg, the Queen's great-granddaughter
 Princess Louise of Battenberg, the Queen's great-granddaughter
 Prince George of Battenberg, the Queen's great-grandson
  Grand Duchess Elizabeth Feodorovna and Grand Duke Sergei Alexandrovich of Russia, the Queen's granddaughter and grandson-in-law (representing the Emperor of Russia)
  The Duke and Duchess of Saxe-Coburg and Gotha (Duke and Duchess of Edinburgh), the Queen's son and daughter-in-law
  The Hereditary Prince of Saxe-Coburg and Gotha, the Queen's grandson
  The Grand Duchess and Grand Duke of Hesse and by Rhine, the Queen's granddaughter and grandson
 The Hereditary Princess and Hereditary Prince of Hohenlohe-Langenburg, the Queen's granddaughter and grandson-in-law
  Princess Beatrice of Saxe-Coburg and Gotha, the Queen's granddaughter
 Princess and Prince Christian of Schleswig-Holstein, the Queen's daughter and son-in-law
 Prince Christian Victor of Schleswig-Holstein, the Queen's grandson
 Prince Albert of Schleswig-Holstein, the Queen's grandson
 Princess Helena Victoria of Schleswig-Holstein, the Queen's granddaughter
  Princess and Prince Aribert of Anhalt, the Queen's granddaughter and grandson-in-law (representing the Duke of Anhalt)
 The Princess Louise, Marchioness of Lorne and Marquess of Lorne, the Queen's daughter and son-in-law
 The Duke and Duchess of Connaught and Strathearn, the Queen's son and daughter-in-law
 Princess Margaret of Connaught, the Queen's granddaughter
 Prince Arthur of Connaught, the Queen's grandson
 Princess Victoria Patricia of Connaught, the Queen's granddaughter
 The Duchess of Albany, the Queen's daughter-in-law
 Princess Alice of Albany, the Queen's granddaughter
 The Duke of Albany, the Queen's grandson
 Princess Henry of Battenberg, the Queen's daughter
 Prince Alexander of Battenberg, the Queen's grandson
 Princess Victoria Eugenie of Battenberg, the Queen's granddaughter
 Prince Leopold of Battenberg, the Queen's grandson
 Prince Maurice of Battenberg, the Queen's grandson

Other descendants of the Queen's paternal grandfather, King George III and their families:
 The Duke of Cambridge, the Queen's first cousin
 Augustus FitzGeorge, the Queen's first cousin once removed
  The Grand Duchess and Grand Duke of Mecklenburg-Strelitz, the Queen's first cousin and her husband
 The Duchess and Duke of Teck, the Queen's first cousin and her husband
 Prince and Princess Adolphus of Teck, the Queen's first cousin once removed and his wife
 Prince Francis of Teck, the Queen's first cousin once removed
 Prince Alexander of Teck, the Queen's first cousin once removed
 Princess Frederica of Hanover and Baron Alphons von Pawel-Rammingen, the Queen's first cousin once removed and her husband
 The Hon. Aubrey FitzClarence, the Queen's first cousin twice removed (and great-grandson of King William IV)

Foreign royals
 The Prince and Princess of Leiningen, the Queen's half-nephew and half-niece-in-law
 Princess Victor of Hohenlohe-Langenburg, the Queen's half-niece-in-law
 Countess Feodora Gleichen, the Queen's half-great-niece
 Count Edward Gleichen, the Queen's half-great-nephew
 Countess Victoria Gleichen, the Queen's half-great-niece
 Countess Helena Gleichen, the Queen's half-great-niece
  The Prince and Princess of Naples (representing the King of Italy)
  Archduke Franz Ferdinand of Austria (representing the Emperor of Austria)
  The Crown Prince of Siam (representing the King of Siam)
  Prince Mahit of Siam
  Prince Albert of Prussia, regent of the Duchy of Brunswick
  Prince Valdemar of Denmark (representing the King of Denmark)
  Prince Arisugawa Takehito (representing the Emperor of Japan)
  The Duke of Närke (representing the King of Sweden and Norway)
  Grand Duke Kirill Vladimirovich of Russia
  Prince Rupprecht of Bavaria (representing the Prince Regent of Bavaria)
  Prince Frederick, Duke of Saxony (representing the King of Saxony)
  The Duke of Porto (representing the King of Portugal)
  Duke Albrecht of Württemberg (representing the King of Württemberg)
  The Hereditary Grand Duke of Luxembourg (representing the Grand Duke of Luxembourg)
  Prince Amir Khan of Persia (representing the Shah of Persia)
  The Hereditary Prince of Montenegro (representing the Prince of Montenegro)
  The Prince and Princess of Bulgaria
  Prince Philipp of Saxe-Coburg and Gotha
  Prince August Leopold of Saxe-Coburg and Gotha
  Prince and Princess Edward of Saxe-Weimar
  Prince Hermann of Saxe-Weimar-Eisenach (representing the Grand Duke of Saxe-Weimar-Eisenach)
  Prince Mohammed Ali Tewfik (representing the Khedive of Egypt and Sudan)
 Prince Charles de Ligne (representing the King of Belgium)

Gallery

See also

 Queen Victoria Diamond Jubilee Medal
 1897 Diamond Jubilee Honours

References

1897 in Canada
1897 in the United Kingdom
Monarchy in Canada
Queen Victoria
British royal jubilees
June 1897 events